Mingyi Myet-Hna Shay (or ) was viceroy of Prome (Pyay) from 1377/78 to 1388/89. He was appointed to succeed his paternal uncle Saw Yan Naung by his other paternal uncle King Swa Saw Ke of Ava. He fought in the Forty Years' War, commanding a naval contingent in Ava's disastrous 1387−88 campaign. He died about a year later.

Notes

References

Bibliography
 
 

Pinya dynasty
Ava dynasty